Steven Lewis "Steve" Hesketh (born 15 December 1988) is an Australian footballer who plays as a defender for Rockdale City Suns in the National Premier Leagues.

External links
 

1988 births
Living people
Soccer players from Perth, Western Australia
Australian soccer players
Expatriate footballers in Indonesia
Liga 1 (Indonesia) players
Perth Glory FC players
Deltras F.C. players
Arema F.C. players
Australian expatriate sportspeople in Indonesia
Bonnyrigg White Eagles FC players
Rockdale Ilinden FC players
National Premier Leagues players
Association football defenders